Integration of traffic data with navigation systems enables navigation systems to use traffic and other related data to optimise routing and travel times by taking into account traffic conditions and other disruptions to traffic flows. The integration may occur in a number of ways. For example, integrated automobile navigation systems use an on-board navigation system and cellular telephone. The navigation system would use the global positioning system (GPS) to position the automobile with respect to streets in a map database, to determine a route to the destination and to update the location as the automobile moves. A cellular telephone in the automobile may then communicate with a traffic information server to obtain travel times for each street segment of the route, which would then be used to refine the planned route, or to offer to the driver as an alternative. The cellular telephone can also be used to provide dynamic travel time information to the traffic information server, with each automobile in the system periodically transferring travel times for each segment that is traversed. The traffic information server would then analyse travel times to update travel time data for each street segment, which is then available to other users when they next connect to the traffic server. Other integration models exist.

According to Consumer Reports, the data may be transmitted through Bluetooth, FM, or XM. 

In 2006, Clear Channel made a deal with BMW to supply traffic data for the carmaker's navigation units. 

According to GPS Review, the suppliers of traffic data to the navigation units get their own data from "road sensors, local departments of transportation, data collected from operators of large fleets of vehicles, and other manual sources such as traffic helicopters and listening to police scanners." 

Patents have been taken out for services that will collect movement data from GPS devices on the road to determine the current travel time between various points.

See also
 Waze

References

Road traffic management
Automotive navigation systems